Kalleh Pir (also Romanized as Kalleh Pīr and Kaleh-ye Pīr; also known as Gal-e Pīr and Qal‘eh Pir) is a village in Haparu Rural District, in the Central District of Bagh-e Malek County, Khuzestan Province, Iran. The country's 2006 census reported a population of 88 people.

References 

Populated places in Bagh-e Malek County